The Kaishintō (lit. Reformist Party) was a political party in Japan.

History
The party was established on 8 February 1952 as a merger of the National Democratic Party and the Shinsei Club, together with most of the Farmers Cooperative Party's Diet members. In May Mamoru Shigemitsu was elected party president.

Having started with 69 seats, the party won 85 in the 1952 general elections. However, the 1953 elections saw it lose nine seats; it also won eight seats in the House of Councillors.

In November 1954 it merged with the Liberal Party and a group of Diet members from the Liberal Party to form the Japan Democratic Party.

Election result

House of Representatives

House of Councillors

References

Defunct political parties in Japan
Political parties established in 1952
1952 establishments in Japan
Political parties disestablished in 1954
1954 disestablishments in Japan